Maria Sykora (born 11 October 1946) is an Austrian sprinter. She competed in the women's 400 metres at the 1972 Summer Olympics. She also competed in handball at the 1984 Summer Olympics.

References

1946 births
Living people
Athletes (track and field) at the 1972 Summer Olympics
Handball players at the 1984 Summer Olympics
Austrian female sprinters
Austrian female middle-distance runners
Austrian female handball players
Olympic athletes of Austria
Olympic handball players of Austria
Place of birth missing (living people)
Universiade medalists in athletics (track and field)
Universiade gold medalists for Austria
Medalists at the 1970 Summer Universiade
Olympic female sprinters